Gevninge is a village, with a population of 1,649 (1 January 2022), in Lejre Municipality on the island of Zealand in Denmark.

History

Gevninge is a small and modern village, but its history dates back to the Iron Age. The earliest indisputable written mention of Gevninge is from 1244, when its name appeared as Giæfning; a source from 1202 may also mention the village. Archaeological finds from the area, including the Gevninge helmet fragment, show evidence of occupation during the Iron Age and Viking Age, from approximately 500 AD to 1000 AD.

Though Lejre is also on the Lejre Å, the river that far south was likely too small for effective navigation. Gevninge may have thus served as the "port of Lejre", an outpost at which any visitor would have to disembark and pass through on the way to the capital.

In the epic Anglo-Saxon poem Beowulf, the titular hero travels to the mead hall, Heorot, the seat of King Hrothgar, on his way to kill the monster Grendel. While the tale is fictional, the anonymous author set the poem in the real world, and Hrothgars seat of Heorot is thought today to have been located at Lejre. Upon disembarking, Beowulf and his men are met with an armed warrior who says his job is to protect the Danish shores; only after Beowulf announces his business is he escorted to Heorot. This has led to speculation that the author of Beowulf may have been familiar with the topography of the region, and imagined his hero disembarking at the site of modern-day Gevninge. For example, working through old maps and the poem of Beowulf, the scholars Gillian Overing and Marijane Osborn passed through Gevninge in an attempt to retrace the journey of Beowulf to Heorot/Lejre as described in the poem.

The fragment of a helmet discovered in Gevninge provides evidence of an armed outpost in the Iron Age and Viking Age.

Notable people 

 Hans Lassen (1926 in Gevninge - 2011) the last Danish Governor of Greenland from 1973 to 1979

References

Bibliography
 
 
  
 
  

Archaeological sites in Denmark
Cities and towns in Region Zealand
Lejre Municipality
Viking Age populated places